Francesco Scarpa (born 18 June 1979) is an Italian football player.

Club career
He made his Serie B debut for Salernitana on 30 August 2008 in a game against Sassuolo.

References

External links
 

1979 births
People from Castellammare di Stabia
Footballers from Campania
Living people
Italian footballers
A.S.D. Sorrento players
A.S.G. Nocerina players
Cavese 1919 players
S.S.C. Giugliano players
S.S. Fidelis Andria 1928 players
Calcio Foggia 1920 players
Paganese Calcio 1926 players
U.S. Salernitana 1919 players
Taranto F.C. 1927 players
A.S.D. Portogruaro players
A.C. Savoia 1908 players
Serie B players
Serie C players
Serie D players
Association football midfielders